Martin Pohl (born 1 October 1986, in Rumburk, Czechoslovakia), better known by his stage name Řezník (in English: Butcher) or M.Engele, is a controversial Czech rapper, an exponent of the horrorcore genre in the Czech Republic. He is known for his provocative songs glorifying violence against women, homeless people, drug addicts, gays, and Ukrainians. Řezník uses general horrorcore themes and he has collaborated with many interprets like King Gordy, Bizarre, Lex the Hex Master, Mastamind, Madchild, Necro, Brotha Lynch Hung, Sean Strange, Snowgoons, Scum, Razakel, The J. Hexx Project, Heaven, Psych Ward, members of Butcher's Harem, etc. According to a leaked poll result of the national Czech music award Český slavík, he won in 2013 in the category "Internet Star". He was, however, disqualified from the poll by the organizers, due to alleged objectionable conduct expressed in his songs. It led to protests of notable Czech artists, such as Tomáš Klus and Matěj Ruppert. In November, 2013, Tomáš Klus announced his departure from Český slavík, while Ruppert returned his own award which he received in 2006, accusing the organizers of censorship.

In 2011, Řezník and his colleagues, rappers Pitva (Autopsy) and Hrobka (Tomb) appeared at court, charged with racism and extremism expressed in their song Konečný řešení (Final Solution). The District Court for Prague 5 has dismissed all charges, pointing to constitutional rights such as freedom of expression or artistic expression. Jan Vučka, a Public Prosecutor, stated that "The police [charge] was based on the fact that you cannot make fun of certain things. However, this is not possible in a free country. It must be clear to everyone who listens to more than one of their songs that this is a hyperbole." The court also pointed to similar provocative artworks produced i.e. by creators of Monty Python, Happy Tree Friends, or Itchy and Scratchy. Řezník, Pitva and Hrobka emphasized that the song was meant to be a parodic exaggeration.

On 30 November 2013, a lawyer of the magazine Týden stated in an interview that Řezník's song Ta holka v mým sklepě (The Girl in My Cellar) contains objectionable passages constituting incitement to discrimination, hostility or violence. The interview had to be removed from the website of Týden on the next day because of death threats the lawyer received by the rapper's supporters.

Discography

Studio albums

Compilations

Other activities
Pohl developed, prior to his rapper career, a series of video games Život není krásný (Life isn't beautiful). He planned 14 titles but the series have only 7 games and number 8 called Život Není Krásný: Poslední Exekuce is on the way. Pohl also directed a few films including a film version of Život není krásný and Deprivační staniol.

References

External links 
  
  

Living people
Czech rappers
21st-century Czech male singers
Czech video game designers
Czech film directors
Horrorcore artists
1986 births